The men's long jump event at the 1971 European Athletics Indoor Championships was held on 14 March in Sofia.

Results

References

Long jump at the European Athletics Indoor Championships
Long